The 2017 Castrol Toyota Racing Series was the thirteenth running of the Toyota Racing Series, the premier open-wheel motorsport category held in New Zealand. The series consisted of fifteen races at five meetings. It began on 14 January at Ruapuna Park in Christchurch, and concluded on 12 February with the 62nd running of the New Zealand Grand Prix, at Circuit Chris Amon in Feilding. Lando Norris was the defending drivers' champion but decided not to compete, concentrating on his European Formula Three campaign, whilst M2 Competition were the defending teams champions. 

Thomas Randle became the first Australian to win the Toyota Racing Series when he clinched the title by five points over Pedro Piquet. In third place overall and the best-placed rookie was Red Bull Junior driver, Richard Verschoor, who led most of the championship through strong, consistent performances. The best-placed Kiwi would be rookie and Ferrari Driver Academy driver, Marcus Armstrong; beating out his other countrymen - Taylor Cockerton and Brendon Leitch.

Teams and drivers
A new team, MTEC Motorsport made their debut this season. In December 2016, the grid was finalized as follows:

Race calendar and results
The calendar for the series was announced on 12 July 2016, and was held over five successive weekends in January and February.

Championship standings
In order for a driver to score championship points, they have to complete at least 75% of the race winner's distance, and be running at the race's completion. All races counted towards the final championship standings.

Scoring system

Drivers' championship

References

External links
 

Toyota Racing Series
Toyota Racing Series